Libštát is a market town in Semily District in the Liberec Region of the Czech Republic. It has about 1,000 inhabitants.

References

Populated places in Semily District
Market towns in the Czech Republic